Hernando Casanova Escobar known as El Culebro Casanova (Neiva, Huila, April 21, 1945 - Bogotá D.C., October 24, 2002), was a Colombian actor, director, singer, and presenter. He is considered one of the precursors of comedy and one of the most important actors in the history of Colombia. His versatility as an actor led him to become one of the greatest icons of acting in Colombia. He was considered during a gap of his career as the best actor in Colombia. In a career spanning over four decades, he received multiple recognitions for his artistic achievements, including a nomination as a 'revelation actor' at the Ondra Awards in Spain and an award for 'best dramatic actor' at the APE.

Casanova started out as a singer at the Club del Clan (1966) and then debuted as an actor with a minor role in Cartas a Beatriz (1969). Later His career gained national recognition for his role as Hernando María de las Casas in the TV series Yo y tú (1975) by Alicia del Carpio.  Wide acclaim and recognition came with his breakthrough role as Eutimio Pastrana Polanía from Don Chinche (1982) by Pepe Sánchez. Where fed with the idiosyncrasy of his hometown, he became one of the most representative and influential figures in the history of Colombian Television. Likewise, Casanova was a pioneer in the sketches format when he was directing, writing and acting in Los Meros Recochan Boy’s, a section of Jimmy Salcedo's hit show El Show de Jimmy (1971). Other of his most notable roles include Salomón in Embrujo Verde (1977), his leading role in Farsán (1983), as presenter in El tiempo es oro, su pueblo gana (1986), Wilson Rodríguez in El Pasado no perdona (1991), Yardines Murillo in Perro Amor (1998) and Vicente Secretario in Amor a mil (2001). In cinema, Casanova was the flagship actor of the Chilean filmmaker Dunav Kuzmanich, even naming him as "the best Colombian actor of all time". Casanova acted in films such as Canaguaro (1981), La agonía del difunto (1982), Mariposas S.A (1986) and Apocalipsur (2007).

In 2015 his children began the production of a documentary feature about his life entitled El Culebro: La historia de mi papá. The film tells the actor's life from the perspective of his youngest son, Nicolás Casanova. It premiered in September 2017 at the Eureka Film Festival. The documentary received favorable reviews and was widely received by the public, highlighting its historical importance. Subsequently, the film was broadcast on the TV show Entre Ojos from Caracol Televisión, becoming one of most watched programs that day. In addition, El Culebro: La exhibición, a sample of photographs, video clips, recognitions and costumes of Casanova's characters in La casa del Huila in Bogotá, was held.

Casanova's controversial private life received much attention. His parties, disorder and excesses led him to struggled with depression and anxiety. He was married twice and had five children. He died on October 24, 2002 from a sudden heart attack at the Cardioinfantil Foundation in Bogotá. His death was a national commotion and was considered a invaluable loss in the entertainment business.

Early Life 
Hernando Casanova was born in Neiva, department of Huila, Colombia, on April 21, 1945, the only male of his parents Blanca Casanova and Guillermo Escobar.  Her mother gave him her last name since his father did not legally recognize him. Casanova attended Santa Librada School in Neiva and he dropped out after ninth grade. At the age of sixteen he joined the National Army of Colombia in the Marine Corps. Besides his duties as a militar, he performed with the soldiers in several plays, musicals and fashion shows. However, two months later, while serving in Buenaventura, he deserted. Soon after, he turned himself in and was transferred to Bogotá to take a course for non-commissioned officers. During his time in the army, he became an Olympic wrestling and featherweight boxing champion in the military engineers unit. Later, he settled in Yaguará, Colombia, to work as a teacher for fifth-grade students.

From an early age, Casanova showed a fascination for the world of entertainment. He performed several plays at his school in Neiva, among them a play about Adam and Eve, where Casanova played the role of Eve. At the age of eleven, he would escape from school to join the circus or participate in RCN's Ondas del Huila radio show, where he sang in the evenings. He also participated in a radio show called El Mundo infantil where he dramatized stories based on real events. Later, Casanova joined Carlos Emilio Campos' theater company. His debut as an actor occurred in his native Neiva, in the middle of a dispute between an actor and Carlos Campos. The actor resigned and it was Casanova who replaced him. After this, he toured the country with the theater company. Hernando Casanova never took drama classes, but he was an avid consumer of cinema and was convinced that much could be learned about the craft in movie theaters.

Filmography

Television

Films

References 

1945 births
2002 deaths
People from Huila Department
Colombian male television actors
Colombian male film actors